Edmonton Journal v Alberta (AG), [1989] 2 S.C.R. 1326 is a leading freedom of the press case decided by the Supreme Court of Canada. The Court held that publication restrictions on matrimonial proceedings, section 30(1) of Alberta's Judicature Act, and on pre-trial stages of civil actions, section 30(2) of said Act, were in violation of freedom of expression rights under section 2(b) of the Canadian Charter of Rights and Freedoms and could not be saved under section 1.

See also
 List of Supreme Court of Canada cases (Dickson Court)
 Edmonton Journal

External links
 

Canadian freedom of expression case law
Supreme Court of Canada cases
1989 in Canadian case law
Publication bans in Canadian case law
Wedding